LA-4 is a constituency of Azad Kashmir Legislative Assembly which is currently represented by the PTI Chaudary Arshad Hussain.He is known as“damri chor".It covers the area of Khari Sharif in Mirpur District of Azad Kashmir, Pakistan.
Mirpur District

Azad Kashmir Legislative Assembly constituencies